Flavel may refer to:

 Flavel, part of the duo Flavel & Neto
 Flavel K. Granger (1832-1905), American lawyer and farmer
 Andrew Flavel (born 1971), Australian wheelchair basketball player
 Anton Flavel (born 1969), Australian Paralympic athlete
 Dale Flavel (born 1946), Canadian politician
 George Flavel, builder of Flavel House
 John Flavel (c.1627–1691), English Presbyterian clergyman and author
 John Flavel (logician) (1596–1617), English logician
 Thomas Flavel (1793–1829), English professional cricketer 
 William Flavel, claimed designer of the Kitchener range cooking appliance, at Flavels foundry, England